Sonderklasse (lit. Special class) is a sailing class designed in 1898 by Lübecker Yacht-Club, Norddeutscher Regatta Verein and Kieler Yacht-Club.

References

Development sailing classes
Keelboats